The Hidden II (styled as The Hidden 2) is a 1993 American direct-to-video science fiction crime horror film and the sequel to the 1987 film The Hidden.

Plot
The alien criminal from the first movie is dead, but he left a few eggs which are hatching now. It is explained that on the alien's homeworld, evolution took two parallel paths: half of their race became violent criminals who live only for pleasure (the squid-like alien form briefly glimpsed in the first film), and the other half evolved beyond their base desires and even physical bodies, becoming creatures of pure energy.

A good alien has been inhabiting Tom Beck's body (played now by Michael Welden). He has been waiting just in case this happened. Unfortunately, his presence in the body has taken a terrible toll on it, draining it of life energy.

Additionally, relations with Beck's daughter Juliet (Kate Hodge), now a cop herself, have deteriorated (possibly due to his bizarre behavior caused by the alien inhabiting his body). But when the killing starts again, both will need to work together—and with a new alien policeman (Raphael Sbarge), who comes to Earth to aid in the struggle—to stop the new generation of aliens.

Release
The film was released direct to video in the United States by New Line Home Video in July 1994. However, in Japan, it was released in September 1993, 10 months ahead of its US release.

In 2005, New Line Home Entertainment released the film on DVD on a double feature release alongside the original The Hidden.

Reception

Creature Feature found the twist of the alien slowly being consumed interesting, but otherwise the sequel was found inferior to the original, giving it two out of 5 stars.

Moria gave the movie a half-star. While it found the pairing of Sbarge and Hodge to be a plus, especially as Sbarge attempts to understand human behavior, but found the rest of the movie to be an example of everything wrong with sequels.

While Entertainment Weekly enjoyed the first movie, it gave this one a D− finding it to be "crud."

The Encyclopedia of Science Fiction notes that the first 10 minutes of this movie are reprised from the first movie.

References

External links
 
 
 

1993 films
1993 horror films
1993 direct-to-video films
1990s science fiction horror films
1990s science fiction action films
1993 action thriller films
1993 crime films
American independent films
American science fiction horror films
American science fiction action films
American action thriller films
New Line Cinema direct-to-video films
Direct-to-video sequel films
Films about extraterrestrial life
Films set in the future
1990s English-language films
1990s American films